This is a list of Norwegian television related events from 2012.

Events
25 May - Martin Halla wins the first series of The Voice – Norges beste stemme.
17 November - Singer Hanne Sørvaag and her partner Egor Filipenko win the eighth series of Skal vi danse?
7 December - 17-year-old opera singer Stine Hole Ulla wins the fifth series of Norske Talenter.

Debuts

Domestic
27 January - The Voice – Norges beste stemme (2012–present)

International
/ Tilly and Friends (NRK)

Television shows

2000s
Idol (2003-2007, 2011–present)
Skal vi danse? (2006–present)
Norske Talenter (2008–present)

Ending this year

Births

Deaths

See also
2012 in Norway